Graciano Junior Gonçalves (born 8 October 1993), commonly known as Graxa, is a Brazilian footballer who plays as a defensive midfielder.

Club career
Graxa was born in Contagem, Minas Gerais, and represented Atlético Mineiro, São José-SP and Náutico as a youth. Known as Graciano with the latter, he made his senior debut on 7 March 2012, coming on as a second half substitute for Rodrigo Tiuí in a 2–0 Campeonato Pernambucano home win against Porto.

In January 2013 Graxa moved to Bragantino, but after being rarely used, moved on loan to União Barbarense ahead of the year's Copa Paulista. He returned to his parent club on 3 October, making his Série B debut six days later by coming on in the 19th minute of a 3–5 away loss against Ceará.

On 26 October 2013, Graxa appeared in a 0–3 loss at Avaí, and was suspended for 180 days after a heavy challenge on Héracles. Upon returning, he was sparingly used, and released in 2015.

After leaving the Massa Bruta, Graxa represented Caldas Esporte Clube and CRAC before moving abroad on 18 July 2016, after signing for Marbella FC. He left the club on 22 December 2016.

References

External links

Graxa at ZeroZero

1993 births
Living people
People from Contagem
Brazilian footballers
Association football midfielders
Campeonato Brasileiro Série B players
Clube Náutico Capibaribe players
Clube Atlético Bragantino players
União Agrícola Barbarense Futebol Clube players
Clube Recreativo e Atlético Catalano players
Marbella FC players
Esporte Clube Mamoré players
Rio Branco Football Club players
Central Sport Club players
Santa Helena Esporte Clube players
Associação Portuguesa de Desportos players
Segunda División B players
Brazilian expatriate footballers
Brazilian expatriate sportspeople in Spain
Expatriate footballers in Spain
Sportspeople from Minas Gerais